University of the Pacific is a private university in Chile. It was founded in 1990 and the main headquarters is in Santiago de Chile.

External links 

  

Educational institutions established in 1990
Private universities in Chile
Universities in Santiago Metropolitan Region
1990 establishments in Chile